Injeh may refer to:
 Injeh-ye Olya
 Injeh-ye Sofla
 Injeh-ye Sofla, Maku